Prof. Abdul Rahim Nagori (1939 – 14 January 2011) was a Pakistani painter known for his socio-political themes. He has held one-man exhibitions since 1958. He taught at the University of Sindh in Jamshoro, Pakistan where he founded and headed the department of Fine Arts.

He was honoured with President's Pride of Performance Award announced on 14 August 2010. He was married to Mehfooza Diwan Nagori.

Exhibitions 
1982: Anti-militarism and violence exhibition which got censored and banned by the martial law regime.
1983: Anti martial law exhibition, sponsored by Pakistan Federal Union of Journalists (PFUJ).
1986: Anti-dictatorship Exhibition held at Indus Gallery, Karachi. Most powerful exhibition of his career where he exposed 62 different awful national events which shook the conscience of the nation.
1988: Anti-dictatorship Exhibition, "Road to Democracy", held at Indus Gallery, Karachi, Pakistan. Reviewed by Mark Fineman of the Los Angeles Times. Painted the evils of society by evolving new alphabet symbols for children, basing them on the events which took place in preceding two years. Bomb blasts, crime, dacoities, guns, heroin, Ojhri, Kalashnikov, rape etc. became new symbols of the alphabet.
1990: "I am you" Anti-violence exhibition, large hoarding for display on road side, sponsored by Deutsche Bank, participated by International Artists.
1990: "Women of Myth and Reality" exhibition at Indus Gallery, Karachi. Repudiated the treatment meted out to the women.
1992: Exhibition on minority, held at Chawkhandi Art Gallery, Karachi. A series of 40 paintings was again a process of social and political protest for the mute, bewildered and confused society which finds itself full of tears, shame, anguish and anger.
1994: Exhibition "Black amongst Blacks" held at Lahore Art Gallery, Lahore.
2004: Exhibition "Return to Sphinx" held at V.M. Art Gallery, Karachi.

Education 
1961–65: B.A. (Hon), Fine Arts (Painting), M.A. Fine Arts (Painting), University of the Punjab, Lahore, Pakistan.

Served as 
1965–66: Lecturer, Dept of Fine Arts, University of the Punjab, Lahore.
1966–67: Head of Fine Arts, Cadet College Kohat, Kohat.
1966–70: Education Officer, Pakistan Air Force.
1970: Founder Head Dept. of Fine Art at University of Sindh, Jamshoro.
1985–1995: Professor, Fine Arts, University of Sindh, Jamshoro.
1983–86: Member BOG, National College of Arts, Lahore.
1984–85: Member NAHE, University Grants Commission, Islamabad.
1984: Chairman, Curriculum Committee, Art Teachers Training Programme, Ministry of Education, Islamabad.
1997–98: Advisor, Federal College of Art and Design, Jamshoro.
1996–1997: Director, Pakistan National Council of the Arts, Ministry of Culture.
1998–: Member BOG, Shaukat Suriya College of Liberal Arts, Hamdard University, Karachi.
1998:Member BOG, Pakistan National Council of the Arts, Ministry of Culture.

Awards
2011: Pride of Performance

Published letters 
National Art Gallery, Daily Dawn Newspaper, 26 November 2001
Shifting of Archives, Daily Dawn, 14 May 2002
Pride of Performance, Daily Dawn 1 September 2002
When Merit Suffers, Daily Dawn, 12 September 2002
On Khushwant Singh, Daily Dawn, 14 October 2002
Artists and political subjects, Daily Dawn, 9 December 2002
Mulk Raj Anand, Daily Dawn, 3 October 2004

Published articles 
A change for the worse, The Star, 9 January 1986
Can Art be called Islamic? The Star Newspaper 13 April 1986
A search in the wrong direction, The Star, 12 June 1986
Art and the Pakistani Press, The Star, 7 August 1986
The artists' place in society, 4 September 1986
The wily serpent lives, The Star, 4 December 1986
Riveras Resolution, The Star, 21 May 1987
The arts as social AWACKS, The Star Newspaper, 8 October 1987
A land of equal opportunity
In scorn of official overtures
The unaesthetic realities of life
Trading Horses for Art, The News International, 7 December 1992
Art under dictatorship, Seminar Paper read at Goethe Institute, Karachi, 18 October 1996

References

External links
Official Website of A. R. Nagori
The loss of a free thinker: A.R.Nagori, DAWN newspaper, 17 January 2011
After Nagori: The man who spoke his mind and painted what he believed in…, The News International, 23 January 2011
AR Nagori: The Unreasonable Man (1939–2011), Himal Southasian, 19 January 2011
In memoriam: The voice of conscience Abdul Rahim Nagori, 1938 – 2011, Daily Dawn Newspaper, 23 January 2011
Tribute paid to Ali Imam, Daily Dawn, 14 July 2002
Return to the Sphinx, Daily Dawn Newspaper, Gallery, 4 May 2004
Sadequain Remembered, Daily Dawn Newspaper, 9 March 2005
Portrait of a Protest, The News International, 20 August 2006
Rebel with a cause, Daily Dawn Newspaper, 26 August 2006
Book Review: The paintings on the wall, Daily Dawn Newspaper, 17 September 2006
Remembering Colin David, Daily Times, 2 March 2008
 A R Nagori: A Retrospective, Art Now 

1939 births
2011 deaths
Pakistani painters
Modern painters
Pakistani educators
Pakistani activists
Recipients of the Pride of Performance
Pakistani educational theorists
University of the Punjab alumni
Academic staff of the University of the Punjab
Academic staff of the University of Sindh
People from Nagaur